Hassan Yektapanah (born 1963, in Tehran) is an Iranian (Persian) filmmaker and screenwriter.

He started his career as an assistant director, first with Jafar Panahi on "The Mirror" (1997) and then on Abbas Kiarostami's film "Taste of Cherry" (1997).

The first film he directed was Jom'e, winning the Caméra d'Or for the best first-time entry at the 2000 Cannes Film Festival.

Filmography
 Djomeh (2000)
Story Undone (2004)
 Bibi (2008)
Forbidden (film) (2017)

Awards and honours 
 Golden Camera, Cannes Film Festival (2000)
 Silver Leopard, Locarno film festival (2004)

External links 
IMDB

References 

1963 births
Living people
Iranian film directors
Persian-language film directors
Directors of Caméra d'Or winners